Con Mis Propias Manos (Eng.: With My Own Hands) is the title of a studio album released by Regional Mexican artist Lupillo Rivera. This album became his second number-one set on the Billboard Top Latin Albums. It garnered Rivera a Latin Grammy nomination for Best Banda Album at the 6th Annual Latin Grammy Awards.

Track listing
The information from Billboard

CD

DVD
This information from Allmusic.

Chart performance

Sales and certifications

References

2004 albums
Lupillo Rivera albums